New Salamis Football Club is a football club based in Bowes Park, London, England.

History
New Salamis was formed in 1971 by fans of Cypriot club Nea Salamis Famagusta, with the Cyprus-based club acting as a parent club. Playing in the KOPA League, a British Cypriot league, the club won the 2016 FA Sunday Cup, following a penalty shootout win against Barnes at Selhurst Park. Ahead of the 2019–20 season, New Salamis were promoted to the Spartan South Midlands League, following a second placed finish in the Hertfordshire Senior League. New Salamis entered the FA Vase for the first time in 2019–20. In 2021 the club were promoted to the Premier Division based on their results in the abandoned 2019–20 and 2020–21 seasons. The following season they were promoted as champions to the Isthmian League North division.

Ground
The club currently groundshare and play at Coles Park, home of Haringey Borough on Saturday and Tuesday nights.

Honours

League 
Spartan South Midlands League 
Premier Division champions 2021–22
Hertfordshire Senior League
Runners-up 2018–19
KOPA League
Champions 1984–85, 1993–94, 1999–2000, 2000–01, 2008–09, 2010–11, 2011–12, 2012–13, 2014–15, 2015–16, 2016–17, 2017–18
Runners-up 1988–89, 1991–92, 1995–96, 1998–99, 2001–02, 2009–10

Cups 
Hertfordshire Senior League Aubrey Cup
Winners 2018–19
FA Sunday Cup
Winners 2015–16
Runners-up 2016–17
London FA Sunday Challenge Cup
Winners 1981–82, 2007–08, 2009–10, 2010–11, 2013–14, 2014–15, 2016–17, 2017–18
Runners-up 2005–06
KOPA League Challenge Cup
Winners 1987–88, 1994–95, 1995–96, 2013–14, 2016–17, 2017–18
Runners-up 1988–89, 1991–92, 1996–97, 2002–03, 2005–06, 2009–10
KOPA League First Division Cup
Winners 1987–88, 1994–95, 1995–96, 2005–06, 2013–14, 2016–17, 2017–18
Runners-up 1988–89, 1991–92, 1996–97, 2002–03, 2009–10

Records
Best FA Cup performance: First qualifying round, 2020–21
Best FA Vase performance: Second qualifying round, 2019–20

References

External links
Official website

Nea Salamis Famagusta FC
Association football clubs established in 1971
1971 establishments in England
Football clubs in England
Football clubs in London
Sport in the London Borough of Haringey
Sport in the London Borough of Enfield
Hertfordshire Senior County League
Spartan South Midlands Football League
Diaspora sports clubs in the United Kingdom
Diaspora association football clubs in England